Aleksandar Jovanović (born 4 August 1989) is an Australian professional footballer who plays as a centre-back for Indian Super League club Bengaluru FC.

Born in Sydney, he also holds Serbian citizenship.

Career
After playing in the Endeavour Sports High School team, Jovanović played with Parramatta in Australia before signing in January 2008 with Serbian SuperLiga club Vojvodina. Because of his youth he failed to make any league appearance that season and in the following one, while in the 2008–09 season, he was loaned to lower league neighbouring clubs Palić and Veternik.

In the summer of 2009, Vojvodina loaned Jovanović to Serbian First League club Novi Sad, where he stayed for a season and a half, becoming a regular player and making a total of 35 league appearances and even scoring one goal.

In the summer of 2011, he left Vojvodina and signed with another Serbian top league club, Hajduk Kula. He made his Serbian SuperLiga debut on 25 September 2011, in for the 2013 K League 2 in South Korea. After one season he moved up a division to K League 1 side Jeju United for the 2014 season.

On 6 February 2016, Jovanović transferred to Chinese Super League side Tianjin Teda. In February 2017, he came back to South Korea and once again joined Jeju United, being a regular in the club ever since. He left Jeju in January 2020, after his contract expired.

On 14 January 2020, Jovanović signed a six-month contract with a possibility of an extension with Bosnian Premier League club Željezničar. He made his official debut for the club in a 0–0 league draw against Radnik Bijeljina on 22 February 2020. Jovanović left Željezničar in July 2020.

On 13 October 2020 he joined Macarthur.

On 22 July 2022, he joined Indian Super League club Bengaluru.

Club statistics

Club

Honours

Bengaluru
 Durand Cup: 2022

References

External links

1989 births
Living people
Soccer players from Sydney
Australian people of Serbian descent
Australian soccer players
Association football defenders
Parramatta FC players
FK Vojvodina players
FK Palić players
FK Veternik players
RFK Novi Sad 1921 players
FK Hajduk Kula players
Aleksandar Jovanovic
Suwon FC players
Jeju United FC players
Tianjin Jinmen Tiger F.C. players
FK Željezničar Sarajevo players
Macarthur FC players
Australian expatriate soccer players
Serbian SuperLiga players
Australian expatriate sportspeople in Serbia
Expatriate footballers in Serbia
Aleksandar Jovanovic
Australian expatriate sportspeople in Thailand
Expatriate footballers in Thailand
K League 2 players
K League 1 players
Australian expatriate sportspeople in South Korea
Expatriate footballers in South Korea
Chinese Super League players
Australian expatriate sportspeople in China
Expatriate footballers in China
Premier League of Bosnia and Herzegovina players
Expatriate footballers in Bosnia and Herzegovina
People educated at Endeavour Sports High School
Bengaluru FC players
Australian expatriate sportspeople in India
Expatriate footballers in India
Australian expatriate sportspeople in Bosnia and Herzegovina
Indian Super League players